Calbuco Archipelago is located in the Reloncaví Sound, Llanquihue Province, Los Lagos Region, Chile.

The archipelago is composed of 14 islands.

List of islands 
The islands are:

 Puluqui
 Caicué / Lagartija	
 Queulín	
 Chaullín / Helvecia (not to be confused with Chaullin Island (Chiloe))
 Huar / Guar	
 Abtao	
 Chidhuapi	
 Quenu	
 Quihua	
 Tautil	
 Calbuco / Caicaén
 Tabón
 Mayelhue
 Lín

The last three islands, Tabon, Mayelhue and Lin, are by low tide only one island.

References

External links 
 

 
Archipelagoes of Chile
Islands of Los Lagos Region
Archipelagoes of the Pacific Ocean